Surface rheology is a description of the rheological properties of a free surface. When perfectly pure, the interface between fluids usually displays only surface tension. But when surfactants are adsorbed on the interface, because they lower the surface tension, the stress within the interface is affected by the flow for several reasons.
 Change in the surface concentration of surfactants when the in-plane flow tends to alter the surface area of the interface (Gibbs' elasticity).
 Adsorption/desorption of the surfactants to/from the interface.

Importance of surface rheology 

The mechanical properties (rheology) of dispersed media such as liquid foams and emulsions is strongly affected by surface rheology. Indeed, when they consist of two (or more) fluid phases, deforming the material implies deforming the constitutive phases (bubbles, drops) and thus their interfaces.

The measurement of surface rheological properties is described by storage and loss moduli. In the case of a linear response to a sinusoidal deformation, the loss modulus is the product of the viscosity by the frequency. One of the difficulties of surface rheology measurements come from the fact that the adsorbed layers are usually rather compressible (at the difference of bulk fluids which are essentially incompressible), and both compression and shear parameters should be determined. This determination requires different type of instruments, for instance oscillating drops for the compression properties and oscillating bicones for the shear properties. These two methods allow investigating the variation of the parameters upon the amplitude of the deformation. This is very useful as the responses of adsorbed layers to deformations are frequently non-linear.

Rheology